WIZN (106.7 MHz) is a commercial FM radio station licensed to Vergennes, Vermont, serving the Champlain Valley and Burlington-Plattsburgh radio market.  The station broadcasts a classic rock radio format branded as The Wizard.  It is owned by Hall Communications. 

Studios and offices are on Joy Drive in South Burlington.  The transmitter is located off Church Hill Road in Charlotte.

History
WIZN signed on the air in October 1983, owned by Radio Vergennes, Inc.  The station began broadcasting from the Stevens House in Vergennes, with an original line up of DJs Artie Lavigne, Russ Kinsley, Joel Bolton, Mary L. Collins, and Bill Henk.  Lavigne served as the president and general manager.  Kinsley was also the program director and music director.  WIZN was a local album rock station in the Vergennes area, powered at only 710 watts on a Class A regional frequency, 106.3 MHz.

By the late 1980s, the station increased power to its current 50,000 watts, and changed its dial position to 106.7, making it a Class C station.  The power boost gave WIZN coverage of Burlington, Vermont's largest city, and much of the Champlain Valley.  But it kept its original rock format and ownership for several decades.  From the late 1990s until 2005, WIZN was the region's longtime home of The Howard Stern Show before Stern left radio syndication and moved to Sirius XM Radio.

In 2005, Hall Communications paid $17 million for WIZN.  Hall moved the station from a mix of contemporary and classic rock to all classic rock, while co-owned 99.9 WBTZ concentrates on younger rock fans, airing an alternative rock format.

Programming
Current on-air staff includes Mel Allen, who hosts The Highway To Mel in morning drive time,  Dave Marshall middays, and Joey Vega with The Rockin Ride Home.

Weekends feature "Double Shots" combining two songs by the same artist, typically a hit song paired with a B side with the exception of the following Sunday programs: "Mr. Charlie" hosts "Blues for Breakfast" on Sunday mornings. The station also airs the syndicated Grateful Dead-focused show The Grateful Dead Hour from 9 pm - 10 pm and the syndicated Pink Floyd-focused show Floydian Slip from 10 pm - 11 pm.

References

External links
106.7 WIZN Facebook

IZN
Classic rock radio stations in the United States
Radio stations established in 1983
1983 establishments in Vermont